Rockaway Branch may refer to:
IND Rockaway Line of the New York City Subway, or its branches
 IND Far Rockaway Branch, terminating at Far Rockaway – Mott Avenue (IND Rockaway Line)
 Rockaway Park Shuttle or IND Rockaway Park Branch
Far Rockaway Branch of the Long Island Rail Road (former Rockaway Division)
Former Rockaway Beach Branch of the Long Island Rail Road